The Kosovo women's national volleyball team represents Kosovo in international women's volleyball and is controlled by the Volleyball Federation of Kosovo.

Competitive record

World Championship

European Championship

Fixtures and results

2021

|-
!colspan="12"|2021 Women's European Volleyball Championship qualifications
|-

|}

Current squad
The following players were called up for the 2021 Women's European Volleyball Championship qualifications.

Personnel

Current coaching staff

References

External links
 

National women's volleyball teams